Cascine is an independent record label based in New York City. Its focus is alternative pop and electronic music. Cascine was formed in September 2010 and is owned by Jeff Bratton.

Key artists include Yumi Zouma, Half Waif, Chad Valley, Maria Usbeck, and Erika Spring among others. More recently, Sui Zhen, Banoffee, Konradsen and Michael David (Classixx) were added to the roster. Cascine also operates CSCN, a digital singles sublabel, and a management company named Gallerie.

History 
Cascine began when Jeff met Sandra Croft, the label's former publicist. Jeff was living in Los Angeles, working for both a corporate PR firm and cult Swedish record label, Service. Sandra lived in London and was overseeing PR for a Service artist. Jeff and Sandra bonded over an unsigned Finnish band named Shine 2009 and started Cascine to release Shine 2009's debut EP, Associates. Sandra became the label's publicist and Jason Romanelli its art director, developing Cascine's visual identity. Jason Kapiskosky, an old friend of Jeff's from Maryland, was also a part of Cascine's beginnings.

Within the first three months of opening, Cascine released records by four artists that helped define its point of view – Shine 2009, Chad Valley, Selebrities and Southern Shores. Since then, the label has continued its brisk pace, coming to be known for its stylish brand of modern pop and electronic music. Cascine is distributed by Redeye.

List of artists 

Airbird & Napolian
Boat Club
Brett
Chad Valley
Cuushe
Ditt Inre
Erika Spring
Essáy
et aliae
Gigi Masin
Half Waif
Jensen Sportag
Kisses
Konradsen
Korallreven
The Legends
Lemonade
Maria Usbeck
Mt. Si
Morly
Picture
RxGibbs
Selebrities
Shine 2009
Softcore untd.
Southern Shores
Sui Zhen
Sun Angels
Tempelhof
Roland Tings
The Mary Onettes
Wildarms
Wintercoats
World Tour
Yumi Zouma

Former artists 
Evan Voytas
Keep Shelly in Athens
Pandr Eyez
Rush Midnight
The Whendays

References

External links 
 Official website
 Redeye Distribution
 The Best Labels of 2012

American independent record labels
British independent record labels